Jean-Pierre Vernant (January 4, 1914 – January 9, 2007) was a French historian and anthropologist, specialist in ancient Greece. Influenced by Claude Lévi-Strauss, Vernant developed a structuralist approach to Greek myth, tragedy, and society which would itself be influential among classical scholars. He was an honorary professor at the Collège de France.

Biography 
Born in Provins, France, Vernant at first studied philosophy, receiving his agrégation in this field in 1937.

A member of the Young Communists (Jeunes Communistes), Vernant joined the French Resistance during World War II and was a member of Libération-sud (founded by Emmanuel d'Astier). He later commanded the French Forces of the Interior (FFI) in Haute-Garonne under the pseudonym of "Colonel Berthier." He was a Companion of the Liberation. After the war, he remained a member of the French Communist Party until 1969.

He entered the Centre national de la recherche scientifique (CNRS) in 1948 and, under the influence of Louis Gernet, turned to the study of ancient Greek anthropology. Ten years later, he became director of studies at the École des hautes études en sciences sociales (EHESS). In 1971 he was professor in the University of São Paulo. This visit was also an act of protest that he made with François Châtelet against the brazilian military government (dictatorship).

He was a member of the French sponsorship committee for the Decade for the Promotion of a Culture of Peace and Non-Violence for the Children of the World. He supported the funding organisation Non-Violence XXI.

He was awarded the CNRS gold medal in 1984. In 2002, he received an honorary doctorate at the University of Crete.

Vernant died a few days after his 93rd birthday in Sèvres.

After his death, his name was given to a French highschool in Sèvres, le "Lycée Jean-Pierre Vernant".

Influence 
The structuralist approach pioneered by Vernant has been influential on a wide range of classical scholars. More specifically, Vernant's reading of the myth of Prometheus was an important influence on philosopher Bernard Stiegler's book, Technics and Time, 1: The Fault of Epimetheus.

Criticism 
Vernant's approach has been heavily criticized, particularly among Italian philologists, even by those of Marxist tendencies. He has been accused of a fundamentally ahistorical approach, allegedly going as far as to manipulate his sources by describing them in categories which do not apply (polysemy and ambiguity).

Awards

Honours 
 Commander of the Légion d'honneur
 Grand Cross of the Ordre national du Mérite
 Compagnon de la Libération
 Croix de Guerre
 Officier of the Ordre des Arts et des Lettres
 Commander of the Order of the Phoenix (Greece)

Awards and prizes 

 1980 : Amic Award of the Académie Française (France)
 1984 : Médaille d'or du CNRS (France)
 1991 : Gold Medal of History (San Marino)
 1993 : Award for Humanistic Studies of the American Academy of Arts & Sciences (USA)

Honorary degrees 

 University of Chicago
 University of Bristol
 Masaryk University of Brno
 University of Naples
 University of Oxford
 University of Crete (2002)
 New Bulgarian University (2004)

Other awards 

 Associate member of the Académie royale de Belgique
 Foreign honorary member of the American Academy of Arts and Sciences
 Corresponding Fellow of the British Academy
 Honorary Member of the Society for the Promotion of Hellenic Studies
 Membre de l'Academia Europaea

Select publications 
 Les origines de la pensée grecque (Paris), 1962 (= Origins of Greek Thought, 1982)
 Mythe et pensée chez les Grecs: Etudes de psychologie historique (Paris), 1965 (= Myth and Thought among the Greeks, 1983)
 With Pierre Vidal-Naquet: Mythe et tragédie en Grèce ancienne, 2 vols. (Paris), 1972, 1986 (= Tragedy and Myth in Ancient Greece, 1981; Myth and Tragedy in Ancient Greece, 1988)
 Mythe et société en Grèce ancienne (Paris), 1974 (= Myth and Society in Ancient Greece, 1978)
 Divination et rationalité, 1974
 With Marcel Detienne: Les ruses de l'intelligence: La mètis des Grecs (Paris), 1974 (= Cunning Intelligence in Greek Culture and Society, 1977)
 Religion grecque, religions antiques (Paris), 1976
 Religion, histoires, raisons (Paris), 1979
 With Marcel Detienne: La cuisine de sacrifice en pays grec (Paris), 1979 (= Cuisine of Sacrifice among the Greeks, 1989)
 With Pierre Vidal-Naquet: Travail et esclavage en Grèce ancienne (Brussels), 1988
 L'individu, la mort, l'amour: soi-même et l'autre en Grèce ancienne (Paris), 1989
 Mythe et religion en Grèce ancienne (Paris), 1990
 Figures, idoles, masques (Paris), 1990
 With Pierre Vidal-Naquet: La Grèce ancienne, 3 vols. (Paris), 1990–92
 Mortals and Immortals: Collected Essays (Princeton), 1991
 With Pierre Vidal-Naquet: Œdipe et ses mythes (Brussels), 1994
 Entre mythe et politique (Paris), 1996
 With Jean Bottéro and Clarisse Herrenschmidt:  L'orient ancien et nous (Paris), 1996.  Ancestor of the West: Writing, Reasoning, and Religion in Mesopotamia, Elam, and Greece, translated by Teresa Lavender Fagan. University of Chicago Press, 2000. .
 With Françoise Frontisi-Ducroux: Dans l'œil du miroir (Paris), 1997
 L'univers, les dieux, les hommes: récits grecs des origines Paris, Le Seuil, 1999 (= The Universe, The Gods, and Men: Ancient Greek Myths, 2001)
 La traversée des frontières (Paris), 2004

References

External links
 Independent obituary by Oswyn Murray
 Page with biographical information, French language
 Citation for Oxford honorary degree
 Council of Europe page
 Links to online interviews and media presentations by Vernant

1914 births
2007 deaths
People from Provins
French Communist Party members
Academic staff of the Collège de France
Historians of antiquity
French classical scholars
Lycée Louis-le-Grand alumni
Lycée Carnot alumni
Academic staff of the University of São Paulo
Members of Liberation-Sud
Members of Academia Europaea
Companions of the Liberation
French hellenists
French anthropologists
20th-century French historians
Academic staff of the School for Advanced Studies in the Social Sciences
Communist members of the French Resistance
Recipients of the Croix de Guerre 1939–1945 (France)
Fellows of the American Academy of Arts and Sciences
Corresponding Fellows of the British Academy
Officiers of the Ordre des Arts et des Lettres
Commandeurs of the Légion d'honneur
Grand Officers of the Ordre national du Mérite
20th-century anthropologists